The 1940 United States presidential election in West Virginia took place on November 5, 1940, as part of the 1940 United States presidential election. West Virginia voters chose eight representatives, or electors, to the Electoral College, who voted for president and vice president.

 West Virginia was won by incumbent President Franklin D. Roosevelt (D–New York), running with Secretary Henry A. Wallace, with 57.10 percent of the popular vote, against Wendell Willkie (R–New York), running with Minority Leader Charles L. McNary, with 42.90 percent of the popular vote.

Results

Results by county

References

West Virginia
1940
1940 West Virginia elections